Pocket Smalltalk is a Smalltalk environment that runs in Microsoft Windows and cross-compiles on the Palm Pilot platform.

The resulting executables are usable on the Palm 3.5 platform and up.

See also 
 Palm
 Smalltalk
 Visual Palmtalk

External links 
 

Smalltalk programming language family